Amen Andrews vs. Spac Hand Luke is a studio album by Luke Vibert credited to two of his aliases, Amen Andrews and Spac Hand Luke. It was released in 2006 on Rephlex Records.

Critical reception
John Bergstrom of PopMatters gave the album 6 stars out of 10, saying, "Whether by design or not, Vibert has made an album that largely mirrors the world it was made in: it's harrowing, violent, perverse—and yet you can't quite give up on it." Gary Suarez of Brainwashed gave the album a favorable review, saying, "Over 13 tracks, this charming yet spastic Jekyll and Hyde routine shifts almost tit-for-tat between furious ravetastic jungle and grimy curb-stomping dubstep, aggressively throwing wild punches and landing several direct hits to the jaw, crotch, and gut."

Track listing

References

External links
 

2006 albums
Luke Vibert albums
Rephlex Records albums